The Commission for Independent Research and Information on Radioactivity (actual name, Commission de Recherche et d'Information Indépendantes sur la Radioactivité, or CRIIRAD) is a French NGO which specializes in the analysis of radioactivity in the environment. It was created in the aftermath of the Chernobyl catastrophe on April 26, 1986. It revendicates "being independent from nuclear exploitants, the state and all political parties".

The CRIIRAD has an analysis laboratory, equipped for identification of radioactive contamination (food, water, etc.), which has been delivered the technical qualification certificate by the Health minister. It operates both in France and abroad, and is funded by its investigations (more than a thousand studies since its creation) and its memberships' adhesions. As all other French NGOs, it is regulated by the 1901 law on non-profit organizations.

Among other studies by the CRIIRAD, its investigations on the contamination of the French territory following the 1986 Chernobyl catastrophe are the most known, although it also studied the consequences of the Marcoule nuclear power plant, the Fukushima I nuclear accidents, and published an atlas of radioactive contamination in Europe and France.

See also 
Yury Bandazhevsky (A Belarusian scientist, repressed by the Belarusian state, who has been supported by the CRIIRAD)
List of Chernobyl-related articles

External links 
 official website
Fukushima contamination in France - What are the risks?

Aftermath of the Chernobyl disaster

Nuclear energy in France
Environmental organizations based in France
Nuclear safety and security
Anti-nuclear organizations